The 1997 ANZAC test was the first annual Anzac test played between Australia and New Zealand. Conceived by the rebel Super League competition, any players aligned with the Australian Rugby League were not available for selection. The game was played on ANZAC Day, 25 April 1997 at the Sydney Football Stadium in front of 23,829 and was won by Australia 34–22.

Squads

Match Summary

See also

References

External links
1997 ANZAC Test - YouTube (full match)

ANZAC Test
ANZAC Test
Anzac Test
International rugby league competitions hosted by Australia
Rugby league in Sydney